The People's Consultative Assembly, the bicameral legislature of Indonesia, passed a series of resolutions of the People's Consultative Assembly or TAP MPR throughout the 1960s, to the very last issued in 2003.

List of MPR and MPRS resolutions 
As between 1960 and 1971 no election for the MPR members happened, the assembly were formed in a provisional measure, known as the Provisional People's Consultative Assembly, which issued TAP MPRs, though there were no difference between the resolutions issued by either by MPRS or MPR.

Resolutions of the MPRS, 1960 - 1968 
The beginning of Sukarno's Guided Democracy were marked with the return to the 1945 Constitution, replacing the parliamentary 1950 Provisional Constitution. With it the formation of Provisional People's Consultative Assembly , which the 1945 constitution prescribed that it consisted of members of the People's Representative Council, regional representatives, and sectoral representatives. Prior to this, in 1955, Indonesia held its first legislative election, and thus the 1955-1960 members of the DPR were popularly elected (which at this point they were considered transitional in nature, until next election).

In March 1960, the DPR unexpectedly rejected President Sukarno's government budget plan. He then proceeded to dissolve the DPR and replaced it with the People's Representative Council-Mutual Assistance, Its members were no longer the previously elected representatives, but rather the president's appointee, who could be appointed or dismissed by the president's will.

Resolutions of the MPR, 1973 - 2003 
On 3 July 1971, Indonesian government managed to hold a long-delayed legislative election which had been planned to follow the first election in 1955.

Two years after the election, between 12-24 March 1973, the 920 members of the People's Consultative Assembly, which were composed of members of the People's Representative Council, representatives of the armed forces, as well as regional representatives, were able to held the first general session of the MPR in Jakarta, which proceeded to formally elect Suharto as President of Indonesia and Hamengkubuwono IX as Vice President of Indonesia. As the Speaker of the MPR for this session is Idham Chalid, who also served as Speaker of the DPR. In total, eleven Resolutions were enacted during 1973 General Session.

The next MPR met in session was during the 1978 General Session of the MPR, formed as result of the 1977 election. Since then, MPR met at least once in every five years, with the speaker of the DPR also served as the speaker of the MPR. 

Sectoral representation to the Assembly was restored in 1984.

Under Resolution number I/MPR/2003, every MPR and MPRS resolutions enacted prior to this were reviewed in its material value and legal status. The MPR then grouped all 139 remaining resolutions into six categories, as follows:

Meanwhile under the following Resolution number II/MPR/2003 on the fifth amendment of the 1999 MPR Rules of Procedure, the assembly renounced its authority to issue further Resolutions and Broad Outlines of State Policy, and limited its authority on seven items, as follows:

 Amend and enact the 1945 Constitution of Indonesia;
 Inaugurate the President and/or Vice President;
 Dismiss the President and/or Vice President within their office term;
 Elect the President/and or Vice President in the event of their office left vacant;
 Amend and enact MPR Rules of Procedure;
 Elect and Inaugurate leaderships of the MPR; and 
 Hear the President's accountability speech regarding the government's performance on the 1999-2004 Broad Outlines of State Policy.

Reformasi period 

On the 2004 General Session, the MPR heard its last presidential accountability speech. From 2004 onward, president and vice president were directly elected in a general election, and thus MPR lost its power to elect president and vice president, or to decide on a president's accountability. In addition, MPR lost its supremacy over other state institutions and its right as the sole executor of the people's sovereignty, and is also on equal footing as other state institutions, i.e. the President and the Supreme Court. 

Under Article 2 and 3 of the Constitution and the 2014 Legislatures Act, which later amended in 2014, 2018, and 2019, and supplemented by various other laws, authority of the MPR is limited on:

 Amend and enact the Constitution of Indonesia;
 Inaugurate the President-elect and Vice President-elect in a plenary session;
 Remove the President and/or Vice President within their office term, following DPR's articles of impeachment have been found to be proven by the Constitutional Court in a decision, and after the president and/or vice president were given chance to explain their action in a plenary session;
 Inaugurate the vice president as President in the event of the president's death in office, resignation from office, dismissal from office, or unable to perform their duties;
 Elect a vice president from two candidates submitted by the President within sixty days, in the event of the vice-president office were left vacant ;
 Elect a president and vice president in the event of both persons left their office vacant at the same time within their office term within thirty days, from a list of two pairs of president- and vice-president-candidate submitted by a political party or a coalition of parties whose presidential pair managed to achieve the most and second-most votes in the previous election, to serve until the end of the office term;
 Enact the MPR Rules of Procedure and MPR Code of Ethics.

Meanwhile, the remaining MPR Resolution were still included within the official Indonesian hierarchy of legislations, only below the Constitution, but above Acts and Government Regulations in-lieu-of Acts.

Notes

References 

Law of Indonesia